The 2012 H1 Unlimited season is the fifty seventh running of the H1 Unlimited series for unlimited hydroplane, jointly sanctioned by APBA, its governing body in North America and UIM, its international body.

The season began in July with the Lucas Oil Indiana Governor's Cup (Madison Regatta), held in Madison, Indiana, United States.

The finale of the season will be in November with the Oryx Cup, held in Doha, Ad Dawhah, Qatar. The 2012 Oryx Cup was the 20th running of the UIM World Championship for unlimited hydroplanes.

Teams and drivers 

All boats are powered by Lycoming T55 L7C, originally used in Chinook helicopters, only turbine engine currently permitted in the series.

Season schedule and results

National High Points Standings

References

External links 
 H1 Unlimited Website

Hydro
H1 Unlimited
H1 Unlimited seasons